The women's marathon was one of the road events at the 2017 World Championships in Athletics in London. It took place on 6 August 2017 on the streets of London, and consisted of four laps of a roughly  course which passed several of London's landmarks. For the first time in World Championships history, the men's and women's marathons took place on the same day. The race was won by Rose Chelimo of Bahrain in 2:27:11, seven seconds ahead of Kenya's Edna Kiplagat in second. Amy Cragg of the United States finished in third, separated from Kiplagat by less than a second.

Catarina Ribeiro of Portugal led for the first  before relinquishing the lead to Great Britain's Alyson Dixon, who opened up a 30-second lead halfway through the race. She was gradually caught over the next , and a pack of fourteen runners vied for the lead until the  point, when Chelimo increased the pace and four runners broke away at the front. Chelimo and Kiplagat battled for the lead of the race, while Cragg and Kenya's Flomena Cheyech Daniel fought for third place. Ultimately, sprint finishes from Chelimo and Cragg secured them first and third respectively.

Qualification
The International Association of Athletics Federations (IAAF, now known as World Athletics) announced the qualifying criteria for the 2017 World Championships in Athletics in March 2016. For the women's marathon, the entry standard was 2:45:00, one minute slower than for the 2015 World Championships, and the same as for the 2016 Olympics. Entry criteria had to be met during the qualification period: 1 October 2016, and 23 July 2017, inclusive.

Preview
In November 2016, the marathon route was announced; the course consisted of four laps of a roughly  route passing by some of London's historic landmarks. The course started and finished on Tower Bridge, travelled along Victoria Embankment along the River Thames until it reached the Houses of Parliament, looped away from the river past St Paul's Cathedral, before heading back to the Tower of London. Niels de Vos, the tournament director, said that the route was designed to be as flat as possible to allow for the possibility of fast times, while also aiming to use well-known landmarks to provide "a stunning backdrop to a huge global TV audience".

For the first time in the World Championships, the men's and women's marathons were scheduled to take place on the same day; the men's race at 10:55 and the women's at 14:00.

The race featured ten women who had previously completed sub-2:22 marathons, leading LetsRun.com to speculate that "You won’t find a deeper marathon on planet Earth this year than the women's race at the 2017 World Championships." They suggested that Edna Kiplagat of Kenya, Ethiopia's Mare Dibaba and Eunice Kirwa of Bahrain were the favourites for the race. Kiplagat had won the marathon twice before at the World Championships, in 2011 and 2013, and had won the Boston Marathon earlier in the year. Dibaba had raced at the 2017 London Marathon, where she did not finish, but was the reigning World Champion, having won in 2015. Kirwa had finished second to Dibaba in 2015, and had also been runner-up at the 2016 Olympics. Athletics Weekly also predicted that Kiplagat and Mare Dibaba would finish in the top-three, but included another Ethiopian, Berhane Dibaba, alongside them. Mary Keitany, who had broken the women-only marathon world record earlier in the year, did not take part in the World Championships, opting instead to prepare for the 2017 New York City Marathon.

Summary
In the opening stages of the race, Portugal's Catarina Ribeiro broke away and led the first  of the race, before she was caught by Alyson Dixon of Great Britain. Ribeiro ultimately dropped out of the race, and did not finish. Dixon ran alone at the head of the field, and by the halfway stage she had established a 30-second gap to the pack behind. During the second half of the race, the main group closed the gap on Dixon, narrowing it to 14 seconds by the  point, and catching her just before the  point. Dixon, who stayed with the leading pack for another  before falling back to finish 18th, said after "I never in my wildest dreams expected to be leading. If you can't enjoy running a World Championship in London with that support, what are you in the sport for?"

After the pack caught Dixon, Kiplagat initially took on the lead, before Australia's Jessica Trengove took over around the  mark. By this stage, the leading group contained fourteen runners, but Chelimo soon increased the pace and split the pack up. A group of four runners broke away at the front: Chelimo; Kiplagat; Amy Cragg of the United States; and Kenya's Flomena Cheyech Daniel. On this occasion, Chelimo counter-attacked and moved back ahead of Kiplagat, who could not respond; and Chelimo held on to claim the gold medal by seven seconds, in 2:27:11. Behind the pair, Cragg managed a sprint finish to beat Daniel to third place, and almost caught Kiplagat; both runners were credited with a finish time of 2:27.18. Dagmara Handzlik of Cyprus, who finished 35th in a time of 2:38:52, established a new national record.

Results

References

External links
 

marathon
Marathons at the World Athletics Championships
World Championships
2017 World
Women's marathons